Arthur Reginald Scammell, CM (February 12, 1913 – August 28, 1995) was a Newfoundland and Labrador writer.

Scammell was born in Change Islands, where he grew up and received his early education. He was a schoolteacher in several Newfoundland outports during the 1930s. He left to attend McGill University and did not live full-time in Newfoundland again until 1970, after his retirement from teaching.

Scammell is perhaps best known for his songwriting, most notably, "Squid-Jiggin' Ground", which he wrote while still in high school, and The Six-Horsepower Coaker. However, he also produced a significant body of work that was originally published in the magazine Atlantic Guardian, of which he was also a co-founder. Through essays and stories, Scammell attempted to convey some of the positive aspects of life in Newfoundland outports, which, despite their disadvantages, he saw as providing a sense of community and personal satisfaction that larger centres lacked.

A collection of Scammell's work was published as My Newfoundland in 1966. In 1987, he became a Member of the Order of Canada. In 1977, he received his Honorary Doctor of Laws from Memorial University of Newfoundland and, in 2011, he was inducted into the Canadian Songwriters Hall of Fame (for "Squid-Jiggin' Ground"). In 1985, the Newfoundland and Labrador Arts Council established an annual award for writers in his honour.

See also
List of people of Newfoundland and Labrador

Bibliography 
 From Boat to Blackboard (1987)

References

 O'Flaherty, Patrick, The Rock Observed, University of Toronto Press, 1979.

Members of the Order of Canada
Writers from Newfoundland and Labrador
1913 births
1995 deaths
McGill University alumni